Cascata means waterfall in some Latin-based languages. It may also refer to:

Cascata, a neighbourhood in Porto Alegre, Rio Grande do Sul, Brazil
Cascata delle Marmore, a waterfall near Terni, Umbria, Italy
Cascata del Toce, a waterfall near Formazza, Piedmont, Italy
Parque da Cascata, a park in Seta Lagoas, Mina Gerais, Brazil
Caracol Falls (Cascata do Caracol in Portuguese), a waterfall near Canela, Rio Grande do Sul, Brazil

See also
 List of waterfalls